Acy is a commune in the department of Aisne in the Hauts-de-France region of northern France.

The inhabitants of the commune are known as Acéens or Acéennes.

The commune has been awarded one flower by the National Council of Towns and Villages in Bloom in the Competition of cities and villages in Bloom.

Geography
Acy is located some 5 km southeast of Soissons. The European Route E46 heading east from Soissons forms a section of the northern border however access to the commune is via the Highway D952 which branches from the E46 in the north-west and goes south-east through the heart of the commune to Serches in the south-east. Access to Acy town is on the Rue de l'Aube which runs off the D952. The D951 branches off the E46 at the same place as the D952 and passes south through the commune to Ambrief in the south. The D6 road forms the southern border of the commune.

The river Aisne forms the northern border of the commune. An unnamed stream flows north through the heart of the commune to join the Aisne in the north.

Towns and villages in the commune
Acy
Jury
L'Aube
La Croutelle
Le Transbordeur

Neighbouring communes and villages

Heraldry

Administration

List of Mayors of Acy

Population

Culture and heritage

Civil heritage
The commune has two structures that are registered as historical monuments:
The War memorial (1924). The War memorial incorporates one item that is registered as an historical object:
A Statue: Angel of the Apocalypse (1924)
The Monument to the 71st Alpine Infantry Regiment (1948). The monument incorporates one item that is registered as an historical object:
A Statue: Weeping (1948)

Religious heritage

The commune has two religious buildings and structures that are registered as historical monuments:
A Calvary on Rue de la Croutelle (1878)
The Parish Church of Saint-Médard (12th century) The Church contains many items that are registered as historical objects:
A Pulpit (20th century)
A Confessional (20th century)
A Statue: Immaculate conception (18th century)
A Bust-Reliquary of Saint-Medard (18th century)
A Statue: Saint Theresa and baby Jesus (1930-1931)
The Furniture in the Church (18th century)
Stained glass figure: Jesus healing, Calvary (1929)
Stained glass figure: Saint Francis of Assisi (1929)
10 Stained glass windows of people (1929)
A Statue: Saint Theresa and the baby Jesus (1930)
A Statue: Saint Sebastian (18th century)
A Baptismal font with cover (1930)
A Painting on the Retable of the Baptismal font with frame: Baptism of Christ (18th century)
A mobile Pulpit and confessional (1930)
A Rood screen: Calvary (1930)
2 Tapestries: Ecce homo and Virgin of sorrow (18th century)
The main Altar, Altar seating, Tabernacle, Choir enclosure (20th century)

Education
There is the Charles-Chevallier primary and nursery school.
The primary school is located at the Town hall.

Notable people linked to the commune
Jules Pressoir (1850-1929): Teacher
Constant Lacroix (1846-1924): Farmer

See also
 Communes of the Aisne department

References

External links
Acy on the old IGN website 
Acy official website 
Soissonnais agglomeration community website 
Acy on Géoportail, National Geographic Institute (IGN) website 
Acy on the 1750 Cassini Map

Communes of Aisne